Uenia Fernandes de Souza (born August 12, 1984) is a female professional racing cyclist from Brazil.

Doping
On November 21, 2015, it emerged that de Souza had returned a positive drugs test for EPO and was subsequently suspended for 30 days.

Palmares

2004
 1st Copa América de Ciclismo
2005
 1st Copa da Republica de Ciclismo 
 5th Copa América de Ciclismo 
2007
 1st Stage 3 part b Vuelta Ciclista Femenina a El Salvador, Multiplaza 
 4th Copa América de Ciclismo 
2008
 1st Copa América de Ciclismo 
2015
 Military World Games Team Road Race

References

External links

1984 births
Living people
Brazilian female cyclists
Brazilian road racing cyclists
Cyclists at the 2007 Pan American Games
Place of birth missing (living people)
Pan American Games competitors for Brazil
Sportspeople from Pernambuco
21st-century Brazilian women